Dighia is a village in Nazirpur Upazila of the Pirojpur District in the Barisal Division of southwestern Bangladesh.It is situated besides the Taltola River.Two religious peoples are living there, they are Muslim and Hindu. Muslim is the main religion of this village.

References

External links
Satellite map at Maplandia.com

Populated places in Pirojpur District